Tavigny Castle is a castle in Tavigny in municipality of Houffalize, Wallonia, Belgium.

See also
List of castles in Belgium

Castles in the Ardennes (Belgium)
Castles in Belgium
Castles in Luxembourg (Belgium)
Houffalize